The Spechhorn (it: Pizzo di Antigine) is a mountain of the Pennine Alps, located on the border between Italy and Switzerland. On its northern side (Valais) it overlooks the lake of Mattmark.

References

External links
 Spechhorn on Hikr

Mountains of the Alps
Alpine three-thousanders
Mountains of Switzerland
Mountains of Italy
Italy–Switzerland border
International mountains of Europe
Mountains of Valais